Kelly Key 2005 is the third studio album by Brazilian pop singer Kelly Key, released on May 22, 2005, by Warner Music. The album features two covers: "Barbie Girl", originally recorded in 1997 by the group Aqua, and "Trouble", originally recorded by the band Shampoo in 1995.

Track listing

Certifications

References

2005 albums
Kelly Key albums